Revigliasco d'Asti is a comune (municipality) in the Province of Asti in the Italian region Piedmont, located about  southeast of Turin and about  southwest of Asti.

Revigliasco d'Asti borders the following municipalities: Antignano, Asti, Celle Enomondo, and Isola d'Asti.

Twin towns — sister cities
Revigliasco d'Asti is twinned with:

  Garons, France (2000)

References

External links
Official website

Cities and towns in Piedmont